Fleshtone is a 1994 film written and directed by Harry Hurwitz.

Plot
A painter plays erotic games over the telephone with a woman.  Her body is found mutilated but it may not be hers after all.

Principal cast

References

External links

1994 films
American erotic thriller films
1990s thriller drama films
Films directed by Harry Hurwitz
American drama films
1994 drama films
1990s English-language films
1990s American films